Jharkhand Mukti Morcha (B), a political party in India 1980–1990. JMM(B) was formed when JMM leader Binod Bihari Mahato, following the decision by the JMM to contest elections in alliance with Indian National Congress. Mahato returned to JMM in 1987, after the killing of JMM president Nirmal Mahto, allegedly with Congress activists. JMM(B) merged with JMM in January 1990.

Defunct political parties in Jharkhand
Political parties established in 1980
1980 establishments in Bihar
Political parties disestablished in 1990
1990 disestablishments in India